Gottlob Bauknecht  (born 30 April 1892 in Neckartenzlingen; died 9 September 1976 in Stuttgart) was a German businessman and engineer.

Life 
Bauknecht found his own company Bauknecht for electrical household appliance. He was married and had two sons, Gert und Günter. He was buried on the Waldfriedhof in Stuttgart-Degerloch.

Awards 

 1952: Order of Merit of the Federal Republic of Germany
 1967: Decoration of Honour for Services to the Republic of Austria

Literature 

 Willi Schickling: Vom Handwerker zum Industriellen. Gottlob Bauknecht. Verlag Gentner Stuttgart, pages 81ff, 1952.

External links 
 Eintrag der Unternehmerbiografie in Deutsche Biographische Enzyklopädie (DBE) (German)
 WDR 5-Podcast: ZeitZeichen from 9 September 2006 (MP3)

1892 births
1976 deaths
Engineers from Stuttgart
German company founders
20th-century German businesspeople
Officers Crosses of the Order of Merit of the Federal Republic of Germany
People from Esslingen (district)